Robert Sargent may refer to:

 Robert S. Sargent (1912–2006), electrical engineer, weapons specialist and poet
 Robert F. Sargent, Chief Photographer's Mate in the United States Coast Guard